Helena Margaretha Van Dielen, also known as Helena Margaretha Van Romondt, (1774–1841) was a Dutch artist, known for painting, drawing and watercolor. Her artwork subjects included flowers, and still life.

She was born in Utrecht (in what is now Netherlands) on 13 March 1774, to Anna Apollonia Decker and Willem Jan Baptist van Dielen. She was the younger sister of painter Adriaan Jacob Willem van Dielen (1772–1812).

Van Dielen married on 29 May 1791 to Otto van Romondt of Dutch nobility and of the municipal council and provincial executive of Utrecht. Van Dielen died in Utrecht on 23 January 1841.

References 

1774 births
1841 deaths
Dutch women painters
Dutch still life painters
Dutch watercolourists
Artists from Utrecht
Women watercolorists